Timo Lahti (born 16 July 1992) is a speedway rider from Finland.

Career
Lahti started his British career riding for the Eastbourne Eagles in 2011. He became the national champion of Finland after winning the Finnish Individual Speedway Championship in 2012. After a total of four seasons at Eastbourne he left after the 2014 season. 

He won a further five national championships from 2015 to 2019 consecutively before being deposed by Tero Aarnio. Before the 2017 win he had returned to British speedway by riding in the top tier for the Poole Pirates in the SGB Premiership 2017.

In 2021, he regained his Finnish title which brought his total number of national titles to seven.

References 

1992 births
Living people
Finnish speedway riders
Eastbourne Eagles riders
Poole Pirates riders
People from Kouvola
Sportspeople from Kymenlaakso